Eric Traut is an American software engineer and software emulation pioneer.  Traut graduated from Stanford University in 1992.  From 1993 to 1995 he worked for Apple Computer, creating a Mac 68K emulator to be used in PowerPC-based Macintoshes.  His work on this project led to a patent on a form of dynamic recompilation.

Traut went on to join Connectix, where he developed successful commercial emulators such as Virtual PC and Virtual Game Station.  He became Connectix's Chief Technical Officer in 2001.

Traut became a Microsoft employee after the company purchased Connectix in 2003.  Traut left Microsoft in late 2012. Traut rejoined Microsoft in May 2014 and is now a Technical Fellow.

References

External links
Eric Traut on Microsoft PressPass
Eric Traut talks about Windows 7 and MinWin

Living people
Microsoft employees
Microsoft technical fellows
American software engineers
Year of birth missing (living people)